"Pregnant for the Last Time" is a song by Morrissey, released as a non-album single in July 1991. This was the first time Morrissey worked with guitarist Boz Boorer, who has consistently worked with him to this day. The single reached number 25 on the UK Singles Chart. B-side "Skin Storm" was originally written and performed by Bradford, while another B-side, "Cosmic Dancer", is a cover of a T. Rex song.

Critical reception
The single was described in NME as a "lovely little music hall ditty" and "far more sprightly and accessible than most of Kill Uncle" in a very positive review. In a retrospective review, Ned Raggett of AllMusic wrote "The title track itself is very rockabilly-glam, from the tribal drums to the heavy guitar twangs, though the curious lyric keeps it from being a Morrissey classic."

Live performances
The song was performed live by Morrissey on his 1991 Kill Uncle tour. He has not performed the song live since then.

Track listings
7-inch vinyl and cassette
 "Pregnant for the Last Time"
 "Skin Storm" (Bradford cover)

12-inch vinyl and CD
 "Pregnant for the Last Time"
 "Skin Storm" (Bradford cover)
 "Cosmic Dancer" (T. Rex cover) (live in Utrecht, The Netherlands, 1 May 1991)
 "Disappointed" (live in Utrecht, The Netherlands, 1 May 1991)

Personnel
 Morrissey – voice
 Mark E. Nevin – guitar
 Boz Boorer – guitar
 Jonny Bridgwood – bass
 Andrew Paresi – drums

Charts

See also
 Morrissey discography

References

External links
 "Pregnant for the Last Time" at Passions Just Like Mine

Morrissey songs
1991 singles
1991 songs
His Master's Voice singles
Song recordings produced by Alan Winstanley
Song recordings produced by Clive Langer
Songs written by Morrissey
Songs written by Mark Nevin